The Karry Youyi (优翼) or Chery A18 is an out of production MPV produced by Chery under the Karry brand, Chery's commercial vehicle division.

Overview

The Chery A18 at launch is a compact MPV based on the SEAT Toledo based Chery Fulwin. The vehicle features MacPherson independent suspension on the front and rear Leaf coils. The powertrain is front wheel drive only and the engine is a 1.5 liter 4-Cylinder 16-Valve SOHC engine, with an additional 1.6 liter SOHC engine for the models sold in China as of 2007. 

Since it was launched in 2007 as Chery A18 or Chery Karry, the MPV has experienced poor sales
due to its lack of functions and bad quality, both the exterior and interior. The Karry name was later developed into an individual sub-brand for commercial vehicles under Chery.

References

Youyi
Compact MPVs
Cars of China